Renato Malavasi (8 August 1904 – 7 October 1998) was an Italian film actor. He appeared in 135 films between 1921 and 1985.

Selected filmography

 The Golden Vein (1928)
 The Song of Love (1930)
 Lowered Sails (1931)
 The Private Secretary (1931)
 Resurrection (1931)
 A Woman Between Two Worlds (1936)
 King of Diamonds (1936)
 To Live (1937)
 Star of the Sea (1938)
 For Men Only (1938)
 A Thousand Lire a Month (1939)
 The First Woman Who Passes (1940)
 La zia smemorata (1940)
 Two on a Vacation (1940)
 Kean (1940)
 Caravaggio (1941)
 The Brambilla Family Go on Holiday (1941)
 A Husband for the Month of April (1941)
 The Hero of Venice (1941)
 Idyll in Budapest (1941)
 Sad Loves (1943)
 A Living Statue (1943)
 The Walls of Malapaga (1949)
 Against the Law (1950)
 Variety Lights (1950)
 Feathers in the Wind (1950)
 Ring Around the Clock (1950)
 Beauties on Motor Scooters (1952)
 Final Pardon (1952)
 Deceit (1952)
 Cavalcade of Song  (1953)
 Disowned (1954)
 House of Ricordi (1954)
 Desperate Farewell (1955)
 The Courier of Moncenisio (1956)
 I 2 deputati (1968)
 Who Killed the Prosecutor and Why? (1972)
 Return of Shanghai Joe (1975)

References

External links

1904 births
1998 deaths
Italian male film actors
20th-century Italian male actors